Wanma means ten thousand in Chinese language, may refer to:
 Wanma Group, owned by billionaire Zhang Desheng
 Zhejiang Wanma, a Chinese listed company co-owned by Wanma Group
 Wanma Technology, a Chinese listed company co-owned by Zhang Desheng
 Zhejiang Wanma Cyclones (now known as Zhejiang Golden Bulls), a Chinese basketball team